ArgBP2 protein, also referred to as Sorbin and SH3 domain-containing protein 2 is a protein that in humans is encoded by the SORBS2 gene. ArgBP2 belongs to the a small family of adaptor proteins having sorbin homology (SOHO) domains. ArgBP2 is highly abundant in cardiac muscle cells at sarcomeric Z-disc structures, and is expressed in other cells at actin stress fibers and the nucleus.

Structure
ArgBP2 may exist in as many as 9 unique isoforms ranging from 52 kDa to 117 kDa (492 to 1100 amino acids). ArgBP2 belongs to the a small family of adaptor proteins having sorbin homology (SOHO) domains and three SH3 domains, which regulate cell adhesion, cytoskeletal organization and growth factor signaling; other members include CAP/ponsin and vinexin. The three SH3 domains are C-terminal, a serine-threonine rich domain resides in the middle, and the sorbin homology (SoHo) domain is N-terminal.  The SH3 domains interact with Arg/Abl, vinculin. The SOHO domain interacts with flotillin found in lipid rafts.

Function 
The subcellular localization of this protein in epithelial and cardiac muscle cells suggests that ArgBP2 functions as an adapter protein to assemble signaling complexes in stress fibers, and that it is a potential link between Abl family kinases and the actin cytoskeleton. ArgBP2 contains several potential Abl phosphorylation sites; Arg and c-Abl represent the mammalian members of the Abelson family of non-receptor protein-tyrosine kinases. In non-muscle cells, ArgBP2 bids Cbl which enhances the degradation of c-Abl; and also Pyk2 which promotes cytoskeletal remodeling. ArgBP2 binding with flotillin at lipid rafts may indicate a role for ArgBP2 in vesicle trafficking and signal transduction. flotillin in skeletal muscle cells exhibits a striated pattern suggesting localization to T-tubules or sarcoplasmic reticular cisternae, though no precise role has been determined in cardiac cells. In cardiac muscle cells, pull-down experiments discovered ArgBP2 in complex with alpha actinin-2, vinculin, spectrin, paxillin, Pyk2 and flotillin, suggesting that ArgBP2 may be involved in myofibril assembly and Z-band signaling in cardiomyocytes, though functional studies are necessary to elucidate specific mechanisms. ArgBP2 has been linked to hypertrophic signaling, as a potent paracrine-acting RNA molecule shown to induce cardiac hypertrophy in mice, miR-21, acts on both ArgBP2 and PDLIM5 to trigger the hypertrophic response.

Clinical Significance
Elevated levels of serum ArgBP2 and coordinate decreases in ArgBP2 in myocardial tissue were detected  in the very early phase from patients post-myocardial infarction who died within 7 hours of the insult. Chromosome 4 pericentric inversion has been observed in 10 patients, with associated cardiac defects linked to terminal 4q35.1 deletions, which may affect SORBS2.

Interactions 

ArgBP2 has been shown to interact with:

 ABL,
 ABL2,
 ACTC1,
 CBL, 
 FLOT1,
 PTK2B, 
 PLDN, and 
 VCL.

References

Further reading